The Sayn (frequently also called the Saynbach) is a small river, just under  long, in the south of the Westerwald hill region of Germany. It rises near Himburg in the Upper Westerwald and empties into the River Rhine in Bendorf (between the towns of Koblenz and Neuwied).

See also 

List of rivers of Rhineland-Palatinate

Rivers of the Westerwald
Rivers of Rhineland-Palatinate
Rivers of Germany